Raj Bhavan (translation: Government House) of Pachmarhi is the Summer residence of the Governors of Madhya Pradesh,  It is located in the city of Pachmarhi, Madhya Pradesh.

History

Pachmarhi used to be the summer capital of Madhya Pradesh. In 1967 it served as the summer capital for the last time. 

Having obtained the status of the summer capital, Pachmarhi has bungalows for the Chief Minister and other ministers too. As a logical extension, it also has a Raj Bhavan for the stay of the Governor.

Building

The Raj Bhavan  was built in 1887, with total area , with initial cost INR 91,344 and modification and renovation between 1933 and 1958; it cost Rs. 64,551. The Dance Hall was  constructed in 1910–1911; it cost INR 20,770. Council Chamber was constructed in 1912 (now the Durbar Hall); it cost INR 14,392.

Apart from this, quarters for the Secretary, ADC and other staff members have been constructed in the Raj Bhavan campus.

See also
  Government Houses of the British Indian Empire

References

External links
 Official Web Site of Raj Bhavan

Governors' houses in India

Buildings and structures in Madhya Pradesh
Pachmarhi
1967 establishments in Madhya Pradesh